Jalal Yousef Sulaimann (21 October 1979 – 12 April 2021) was a Venezuelan professional pool player, specifically nine-ball.

Career
Salaimann was primarily a nine-ball player, having competed at the WPA World Nine-ball Championships since 2013. His best result, however, was reaching the last 16 of the 2012 WPA World Eight-ball Championship. Jalal also competed at the 2013 World Games; losing in the last 16. Before his time in 9-ball, Yousef competed in the WPA World Ten-ball Championship in 2010 and 2011.

On 12 April 2021, he died of COVID-19.

References

External links
 Jalal Yousef on AZ Billiards

1979 births
2021 deaths
Venezuelan pool players
Venezuelan people of Emirati descent
Deaths from the COVID-19 pandemic in Venezuela